Francis Bertody Sumner (August 1, 1874 – September 6, 1945) was an American ichthyologist, zoologist and writer.

Sumner was born in Pomfret, Connecticut. He studied at the University of Minnesota and Columbia University where in 1901 he received a PhD with a thesis on fish embryology. He became the Director of the U.S. Bureau of Fisheries Laboratory at Woods Hole. He worked as a Professor of Biology at the Scripps Institution of Oceanography.

Sumner collected many subspecies of Peromyscus in California. He also studied the pigments of fishes.

Publications

A Biological Survey of the Waters of Woods Hole and Vicinity (1913)
Heredity, Environment, and Responsibility (1921)
Genetic, Distributional, and Evolutionary Studies of the Subspecies of Deer Mice (Peromyscus) (1932)
The Life History of an American Naturalist (1945)

References

1874 births
1945 deaths
American ichthyologists
American zoologists
Columbia University alumni
People from Pomfret, Connecticut
Lamarckism